Pospelov, female form Pospelova, is a Russian surname. Notable people with this surname include:
Aleksandra Pospelova (born 1998), Russian tennis player
Dmytro Pospelov (born 1991), Ukrainian football player
Maria V. Pospelova-Shtrom (1902–1991), Russian entomologist
Pyotr Pospelov (1898–1979), Soviet scientist and functionary
Pospelov Commission
Svetlana Pospelova (born 1979), Russian sprinter

Russian-language surnames